The Salina Municipal Building and Library is a historic building in Salina, Utah. The original city hall was built in 1887, and torn down to make way for this new building. Construction began in 1936, and it was completed in 1937. It was built under the Works Progress Administration program by M.W. Breinholt, who was a building contractor in nearby Richfield, Utah for six decades. The building was designed in the Prairie School and Art Deco architectural styles. It has been listed on the National Register of Historic Places since April 9, 1986.

References

National Register of Historic Places in Sevier County, Utah
Prairie School architecture in Utah
Art Deco architecture in Utah
Buildings and structures completed in 1936
1936 establishments in Utah
Libraries on the National Register of Historic Places in Utah
Government buildings on the National Register of Historic Places in Utah